Deepak Punia may refer to:
 Deepak Punia (cricketer)
 Deepak Punia (wrestler)